White Lake is a census-designated place (CDP) in the town of Forestport, Oneida County, New York, United States. It was first listed as a CDP prior to the 2020 census.

The CDP is in northeastern Oneida County, at the southwestern edge of the Adirondacks. It is in the northern part of the town of Forestport and surrounds White Lake, the outlet of which flows south through Bear Creek and Woodhull Creek to the Black River at Woodhull. The White Lake CDP includes part of the hamlet of Woodgate.

New York State Route 28 runs through the community, leading southwest  to State Route 12 at Alder Creek and northeast  to Old Forge.

Demographics

References 

Census-designated places in Oneida County, New York
Census-designated places in New York (state)